Horisme intestinata, the brown bark carpet moth, is a moth of the  family Geometridae. It is widespread throughout most of temperate North America. The habitat consists of wooded areas.

The wingspan is 21–32 mm. The pale tan forewings are marked with fine parallel lines. The PM and ST lines are deeply scalloped. The wide costal streak is almost unmarked. Adults are on wing from late May to late July and again from early September to early October.

The larvae have been recorded feeding on garden Clematis.

References

Moths described in 1857
Melanthiini